Elton Hill is a suburb of Johannesburg, South Africa. It is a small suburb tucked between Athol and Melrose. It is located in Region E of the City of Johannesburg Metropolitan Municipality.

History
Prior to the discovery of gold on the Witwatersrand in 1886, the suburb lay on land on one of the original farms called Syferfontein. It became a suburbs on 1 June 1949, developed by John Ellis Crofton and the suburb name is based on his middle and last names.

References

Johannesburg Region E